Renata Galasso is an American entrepreneur and former baseball card dealer.

Galasso reportedly began her business in the early 1970s as a way to pay for college.  She purchased individual packs of cards—primarily Topps—and built sets for sale, which was unusual for that time. (The first verifiable complete sets sold were in the 1974 J.C. Penney catalog.)

Galasso eventually opened a shop around 1975 on Bay Ridge Parkway and later relocated to 6305 10th Avenue in Brooklyn, New York.  At one point, Galasso claimed in her catalogs and shipping labels to be the "World's Largest Hobby Card Dealer."  Galasso printed some cards in partnerships with Topps and The Card Memorabilia Associates, Ltd. (TCMA) and eventually printed some independent card sets as well.

One well known set of cards, called "Galasso Glossy Greats," was issued over a period of eight years between 1974 and 1984. At the time, most baseball card cards from companies such as Topps were not issued in set form. Galasso assembled sets herself and sold them to individuals via mail order. Each 45-card series of Galasso Glossy Greats were issued as a promotion. Customers who bought a complete set of baseball cards received one of the 45-card sets for free.

The cards were printed on a light glossy paper stock.

Following is a description of each set:

 Series 1: This series was issued in 1977 and depicts stars of the 1950s (Ted Williams, Stan Musial, Mickey Mantle, and more). The cards in this series were numbered 1–45.
 Series 2: This series was issued in 1979 and depicts stars of the 1930s (Babe Ruth, Lou Gehrig, Lefty Grove, and more). The cards in this series are numbered 46–90.
 Series 3: This series was issued in 1980 and depicts stars of the 1920s (Babe Ruth, Lou Gehrig, Lefty Grove, and more). The cards in this series are numbered 91–135.
 Series 4: This series was issued in 1981 and depicts stars of the 1910s (Ty Cobb, Christy Mathewson, Nap Lajoie, and more). The cards in this series are numbered 136–180.
 Series 5: This series was issued in 1983 and depicts stars of the 1933 first All-Star Game, played July 6, 1933, at Comiskey Park in Chicago. The cards in this series are numbered 181-225.
 Series 6: This series was issued in 1984 and depicts stars who achieved a variety of feats. The cards in this set are numbered 226–270. This set is much more difficult to purchase as a complete set. The first five series are readily found at card shows and on auction sites.

The company continued in the sports card business until at least the late 1990s.  Renata Galasso Inc. is currently listed online as a retail mail-order house.

External links
Flickr
Fleersticker
Manta

References

Baseball cards
Baseball culture
Living people
Year of birth missing (living people)